USS Damon Cummings may refer to more than one United States Navy ship:

 , a destroyer escort cancelled in 1943
 , a destroyer escort in commission from 1944 to 1947

See also
 

United States Navy ship names